Nový Knín is a town in Příbram District in the Central Bohemian Region of the Czech Republic. It has about 2,100 inhabitants. The historic town centre is well preserved and is protected by law as an urban monument zone.

Administrative parts
Villages of Chramiště, Kozí Hory, Libčice and Sudovice are administrative parts of Nový Knín.

Geography
It is situated on the small river of Kocába. It lies in the Benešov Uplands.

History

The first written mention of Nový Knín is from 1186, when members of the Přemyslid dynasty, dukes Frederick and Conrad II agreed and signed here the final annexation of Moravia to Bohemia. In the 14th century, Nový Knín became the centre of gold mining in the area and became a prospering mining town. School, brewery and vineyard were established here. Gold mining was suspended during the Hussite Wars. It was later renewed several times, but always on a significantly smaller scale than in the 14th century.

Until 1918, Nový Knín – Neu Knin was part of the Austrian monarchy (Austria side after the compromise of 1867), in the Pribram – Příbram District, one of the 94 Bezirkshauptmannschaften in Bohemia.

Sights

The landmark of Nový Knín is the Church of Saint Nicholas. It was originally a Romanesque church from the second half of the 12th century, first documented in 1186. In 1773–1774, it was baroque rebuilt, but several romanesque elements have been preserved.

The so-called Mincovna (meaning "mint") is a historical Renaissance building from the 16th century, with an Empire style façade from 1810. The building is linked to gold mining in the region. It originally served as the seat of a royal official, today it houses the Museum of Gold.

Twin towns – sister cities

Nový Knín is twinned with:
 Ledro, Italy

References

External links

Cities and towns in the Czech Republic
Populated places in Příbram District